Robin Schoenaker (born 23 August 1995) is a Dutch handball player for Sporting Pelt and the Dutch national team.

He represented the Netherlands at the 2020 European Men's Handball Championship.

References

1995 births
Living people
Dutch male handball players
Sportspeople from Arnhem
Expatriate handball players
Dutch expatriate sportspeople in Belgium